Minister for European Affairs or Minister of European Affairs may refer to:

Minister for European Affairs (Finland)
Minister for European Affairs (Italy)
Minister for European Neighbourhood and the Americas (United Kingdom)
Minister of European Affairs (Denmark)
Minister of State for European Affairs (Ireland)
Ministry for Europe and Foreign Affairs (France)

Europe